Larry David Paciotti (born November 8, 1959) is an American director of pornographic films. He appears as the drag-diva persona Chi Chi LaRue, and has been credited as director under the names "Lawrence David" and "Taylor Hudson".

Career 
"Chi Chi LaRue" began when Paciotti moved to the Minneapolis-Saint Paul area and started performing in drag as one-half of "The Weather Gals", a "hag drag" revue. He and a friend moved to California, where LaRue was hired by Catalina Video as an administrative assistant and publicist because of his knowledge of porn and the workings of the porn industry. Even as a "DJ" ("DJ Paciotti"), Paciotti conducts most public business as "Chi Chi LaRue", and has a significant presence in the pornographic film industry, moving up the line of responsibility and creativity so that he was soon directing high-demand pornographic product. LaRue has directed hundreds of gay porn films since 1988, mainly for Falcon Studios. He now owns Catalina Video, a label under his umbrella company Channel 1 Releasing.

In 2003, LaRue began to divide his directorial attention between two porn studios: Vivid Video, where he got along with much of the female talent (particularly Jenna Jameson and Tera Patrick), and his own Rascal Video.

In March 2004, LaRue was preparing to leave to travel to London to direct Taking Flight (the studio's two-part annual travelogue) when he had a mild heart attack. Instead of abandoning the production, Falcon hired Chris Steele, the script's author, to direct. In 2005, LaRue shot his last film for Falcon, called Heaven to Hell (the tale of an angel sexually tempted by the Devil and then cast into hell). It was the only movie ever to be cast of Falcon exclusives.

In 2006, LaRue announced that he would no longer produce films for Vivid Video because they were featuring actors and actresses having sex without condoms.

In 2007, LaRue was chosen as one of Out magazine's Top 50 most influential people in the LGBT community.

In August 2008, he directed the controversial bisexual film titled Shifting Gears. LaRue coined the term "straight-for-pay" (a play on "gay-for-pay"), to describe performer Blake Riley's first encounter with a woman.

In 2012, LaRue directed the music video for "Trouble" by RuPaul's Drag Race contestant Willam Belli, which premiered on Logo TV.

In 2015, LaRue admitted himself into drug and alcohol treatment in Minnesota, feeling he was "near death", according to friend Kevin Molin.

Awards 

 1990 Dave Awards winner of Best Video and Best Director for "More of a Man" (All Worlds Video).
 1991 AVN award Best Director (Gay Video) – "The Rise" (as Taylor Hudson), Catalina Video.
 1991 AVN Award Best Non-Sexual Performance–Bi, Gay, or Trans Video – "More of a Man", All Worlds Video.
 1992 Gay Erotic Video Awards Best Director – "Songs in the Key of Sex", HIS Video (tied with Jerry Douglas, "Kiss-Off", All Worlds Video).
 1993 AVN Award Best Director (Gay Video) – "Songs in the Key of Sex", HIS Video.
 1993 Gay Erotic Video Award Best Special Interest Video – "Chi Chi LaRue's Hardbody Video Magazine", Odyssey Men.
 1993 Gay Erotic Video Award Best Gender Bender – "Valley of the Bi Dolls", Catalina Video.
 1994 Gay Erotic Video Award Best Non-Sexual Role – "Revenge of the Bi-Dolls", Catalina Video.
 1995 Gay Erotic Video Award Best Director – "Idol Country", HIS Video.
 2000 Grabby Award winner of Best Director and Best Video.
 2001 GayVN Award Best Director – "Echoes", Men of Odyssey.
 2002 GayVN Award Best Director (Bisexual Video) – "Mile Bi Club", All Worlds Video.
 2003 GayVN Award Best Director (with John Rutherford) – "Deep South: The Big and the Easy Part 1" and "Part 2", Falcon Studios.
 2006 Grabby Award Best Director  – "Wrong Side of the Tracks Part One" and "Part Two", Rascal Video.
 2009 GayVN Award Trailblazer
 2011 Cyber Socket "Best Personality"
 2012 Cyber Socket "Best Personality"
 2020 Special Stiletto Award : Evolution Wonderloundge Hall of fame

See also 
 List of Grabby recipients
 List of pornographic movie studios
 List of male performers in gay porn films
 Gachimuchi

References

External links
 
 
 

1959 births
Living people
People from Hibbing, Minnesota
American pornographic film directors
American pornographic film producers
LGBT film directors
LGBT people from Minnesota
American drag queens
Directors of gay pornographic films
Producers of gay pornographic films
Directors of bisexual pornographic films
Film directors from Minnesota
21st-century LGBT people